Mesirah (or mesira) is the action in which one Jew reports the conduct of another Jew to a non-rabbinic authority in a manner and under the circumstances forbidden by rabbinic law. 
This may not necessarily apply to reporting legitimate crimes to responsible authority, but does apply to turning over a Jew to an abusive authority, or to a legitimate one who would punish the criminal in ways seen as excessive by Jewish community, though "excessive" punishment by non-Jews may be permissible if a precept of the Torah has been violated.

The term for an individual who commits mesirah is moser or mossur. A person who repeatedly violates this law by informing on his fellow Jews is considered subject to "Din Moser" (law of the informer), which is analogous to "Din rodef" in that both prescribe death for the offender, and according to some, in some circumstances the offender may be killed without warning.

Source of the ban 
The source of the ban comes from the Bava Kamma section of the Babylonian Talmud. The law was most likely instigated to ease Jewish life under Roman or Persian rule. This law is discussed in Babylonian Talmud by Rambam and in Shulchan Aruch. Shulchan Aruch, however, states that in the cases where if Jews do not testify against other Jews in the gentile court, it will be obvious that Jews are covering up for each other, they should testify.

Maimonides states: 

Maimonides further explains: "It is forbidden to hand over a Jew to the heathen, neither his person nor his goods, even if he is wicked and a sinner, even if he causes distress and pain to fellow-Jews. Whoever hands over a Jew to the heathen has no part in the next world. It is permitted to kill a moser (informant) wherever he is. It is even permitted to kill him before he has handed over (a fellow Jew)."

Modern times
According to Michael Broyde, there are many different opinions among 20th-century rabbis as to the extent and circumstances mesirah is still valid in modern times.

According to The Times of Israel and a Channel 4 investigation, the concept of mesirah was used by a Haredi leader to protect community members investigated for child molestation from police investigation.

The principle of mesirah has also been used to dissuade Jewish auditors from reporting other Jews to the IRS for tax fraud.

Rabbinic courts in Israel have issued writs calling for social exclusion of Jews bringing legal issues to Israel's civil courts.

Rabbi Chaim Kanievsky, a leading Israeli rabbi and posek in Haredi Jewish society ruled that reporting instances of sexual child abuse to the police is consistent with Jewish law. Other major Orthodox poskim in America, such as Rabbi Hershel Shachter also concur that abuse cases should be reported in full to the civil authorities.

Mesirah has also been cited as one of the main reasons for the gross underreporting in the sexual abuse cases in Brooklyn's Haredi community.

In Australia 

The mesirah doctrine came under intense public scrutiny in Australia in early 2015 as a result of evidence given to the Royal Commission into Institutional Responses to Child Sexual Abuse relating to an alleged long-running and systematic cover-up of child sexual abuse and the institutional protection of perpetrators at the exclusive Melbourne boys' school Yeshiva College. On 28 January 2015 Fairfax Media reported secret tape recordings and emails had been disclosed, which revealed that members of Australia's Orthodox Jewish community who assisted police investigations into alleged child sexual abuse were pressured to remain silent on the matter. Criminal barrister Alex Lewenberg was alleged to have been "disappointed", and to have berated a Jew who had been a victim of a Jewish sex offender and whom he subsequently regarded as a mossur for breaking with mesirah tradition. Lewenberg was subsequently found guilty of professional misconduct.

In February 2015 Zephaniah Waks, an adherent of the ultra-Orthodox Hasidic Chabad sect in Melbourne, Australia, testified to the Royal Commission that following his discovery that one of his sons had been sexually abused by Rabbi David Kramer, a teacher at their school, Yeshiva College, he confronted the school's principal, Rabbi Abraham Glick and demanded that Kramer be sacked. Waks told of his shock when he learned a few days later that Kramer was still working at the school, and that he again confronted Rabbi Glick, who then claimed that Kramer had admitted his guilt "because he wanted to be caught", but that the school could not dismiss Kramer because, Glick claimed, he was at risk of self-harm. Waks also told the Commission that despite his anger, he felt constrained not to go to the authorities because of the doctrine of mesirah:

Waks said the concept of mesirah prevented members of the ultra-Orthodox Chabad sect of Judaism from going to secular authorities.

Giving evidence to the Commission on the day before his father, Menachem (Manny) Waks, one of three children from the Waks family who were sexually abused by staff at Yeshiva College, testified that after breaking mesirah by going public about his abuse, he and his family had been ostracised by rabbinical leaders, shunned by his community and subjected to a sustained campaign of abuse, intimidation and threats, which eventually forced Waks to leave Australia with his wife and children. He also testified about how members of the exclusive Chabad community had pressured him to abandon his advocacy:

Counsel Assisting the commission then asked Waks how he felt having been accused of being an informer:

In December 2017, the Commission's final report included a recommendation to Jewish institutions:

References

External links

Jewish law
Hasidic Judaism
Law enforcement terminology